Safyany is a lake in the south-western Ukraine, in the delta of the Dniester River. It is located near the city of Bilyayivka.

Sources 
 Трансграничное сотрудничество и устойчивое управление в бассейне р. Днестр: Фаза III — реализация Программы действий» («Днестр-III») / КОМПЛЕКСНЫЕ МОЛДО-УКРАИНСКИЕ ИССЛЕДОВАНИЯ ИХТИОФАУНЫ ВОДОЕМОВ БАССЕЙНА НИЖНЕГО ДНЕСТРА — / Тромбицкий И. Д., Бушуев С. Г. — ОБСЕ/ ЕЭК ООН/ ЮНЕП, 2011.

Landforms of Odesa Oblast
Safyany
Biliaivka